As of September 2014, the World Checklist of Selected Plant Families recognized 215 species in the genus Guzmania, including hybrids:

 Guzmania acorifolia (Griseb.) Mez
 Guzmania acuminata L.B.Sm.
 Guzmania acutispica E.Gross
 Guzmania aequatorialis L.B.Sm.
 Guzmania albescens H.Luther & Determann
 Guzmania alborosea H.Luther
 Guzmania alcantareoides H.Luther
 Guzmania alliodora E.Gross
 Guzmania altsonii L.B.Sm.
 Guzmania ×  amoena H.Luther
 Guzmania amplectens L.B.Sm.
 Guzmania andreana (E.Morren) Mez
 Guzmania andreettae Rauh
 Guzmania angustifolia (Baker) Wittm.
 Guzmania apiculata L.B.Sm.
 Guzmania armeniaca H.Luther
 Guzmania asplundii L.B.Sm.
 Guzmania atrocastanea H.Luther
 Guzmania attenuata L.B.Sm. & Read
 Guzmania bakeri (Wittm.) Mez
 Guzmania barbiei Rauh
 Guzmania bergii H.Luther
 Guzmania berteroniana (Schult. & Schult.f.) Mez
 Guzmania besseae H.Luther
 Guzmania betancurii H.Luther
 Guzmania bicolor L.B.Sm.
 Guzmania bipartita L.B.Sm.
 Guzmania bismarckii Rauh
 Guzmania blassii Rauh
 Guzmania brackeana Manzan.
 Guzmania bracteosa (André) André ex Mez
 Guzmania brasiliensis Ule
 Guzmania breviscapa H.Luther
 Guzmania brevispatha Mez
 Guzmania butcheri Rauh
 Guzmania cabrerae Gilmartin
 Guzmania calamifolia André ex Mez
 Guzmania calothyrsus Mez
 Guzmania candelabrum (André) André ex Mez
 Guzmania caricifolia (André) L.B.Sm.
 Guzmania cerrohoyaensis H.Luther
 Guzmania cinnabarina H.Luther & K.F.Norton
 Guzmania circinnata Rauh
 Guzmania claviformis H.Luther
 Guzmania compacta Mez
 Guzmania condensata Mez & Wercklé
 Guzmania condorensis H.Luther
 Guzmania confinis L.B.Sm.
 Guzmania confusa L.B.Sm.
 Guzmania conglomerata H.Luther
 Guzmania conifera (André) André ex Mez
 Guzmania coriostachya (Griseb.) Mez
 Guzmania corniculata H.Luther
 Guzmania cuatrecasasii L.B.Sm.
 Guzmania cuzcoensis L.B.Sm.
 Guzmania cylindrica L.B.Sm.
 Guzmania dalstroemii H.Luther
 Guzmania danielii L.B.Sm.
 Guzmania darienensis H.Luther
 Guzmania delicatula L.B.Sm.
 Guzmania densiflora Mez
 Guzmania desautelsii Read & L.B.Sm.
 Guzmania devansayana E.Morren
 Guzmania diazii H.Luther
 Guzmania diffusa L.B.Sm.
 Guzmania dissitiflora (André) L.B.Sm.
 Guzmania donnellsmithii Mez ex Donn.Sm.
 Guzmania dudleyi L.B.Sm.
 Guzmania dussii Mez
 Guzmania ecuadorensis Gilmartin
 Guzmania eduardi André ex Mez
 Guzmania ekmanii (Harms) Harms ex Mez
 Guzmania elvallensis H.Luther
 Guzmania erythrolepis Brongn. ex Planch.
 Guzmania farciminiformis H.Luther
 Guzmania fawcettii Mez
 Guzmania ferruginea H.Luther
 Guzmania filiorum L.B.Sm.
 Guzmania flagellata S.Pierce & J.R.Grant
 Guzmania foetida Rauh
 Guzmania formosa H.Luther
 Guzmania fosteriana L.B.Sm.
 Guzmania fuerstenbergiana (Kirchhoff & Wittm.) Wittm.
 Guzmania fuquae H.Luther & Determann
 Guzmania garciaensis Rauh
 Guzmania glaucophylla Rauh
 Guzmania globosa L.B.Sm.
 Guzmania glomerata Mez & Wercklé
 Guzmania gloriosa (André) André ex Mez
 Guzmania goudotiana Mez
 Guzmania gracilior (André) Mez
 Guzmania gracilis H.Luther
 Guzmania graminifolia (André ex Baker) L.B.Sm.
 Guzmania harlingii H.Luther
 Guzmania hedychioides L.B.Sm.
 Guzmania henniae H.Luther
 Guzmania herrerae H.Luther & W.J.Kress
 Guzmania hirtzii H.Luther
 Guzmania hitchcockiana L.B.Sm.
 Guzmania hollinensis H.Luther
 Guzmania inexpectata H.Luther
 Guzmania inkaterrae Gouda & C.Soto
 Guzmania izkoi Manzan. & W.Till
 Guzmania jaramilloi H.Luther
 Guzmania kalbreyeri (Baker) L.B.Sm.
 Guzmania kareniae H.Luther & K.F.Norton
 Guzmania kennedyae L.B.Sm. & Read
 Guzmania kentii H.Luther
 Guzmania killipiana L.B.Sm.
 Guzmania kraenzliniana Wittm.
 Guzmania kressii H.Luther & K.F.Norton
 Guzmania laeta H.Luther
 Guzmania lehmanniana (Wittm.) Mez
 Guzmania lellingeri L.B.Sm. & Read
 Guzmania lemeana Manzan.
 Guzmania leonard-kentiana H.Luther & K.F.Norton
 Guzmania lepidota (André) André ex Mez
 Guzmania lindenii (André) Mez
 Guzmania lingulata (L.) Mez
 Guzmania ×  litaensis H.Luther
 Guzmania longibracteata Betancur & N.R.Salinas
 Guzmania longipetala (Baker) Mez
 Guzmania loraxiana J.R.Grant
 Guzmania lychnis L.B.Sm.
 Guzmania macropoda L.B.Sm.
 Guzmania madisonii H.Luther
 Guzmania manzanaresiorum H.Luther
 Guzmania marantoidea (Rusby) H.Luther
 Guzmania megastachya (Baker) Mez
 Guzmania melinonis Regel
 Guzmania membranacea L.B.Sm. & Steyerm.
 Guzmania mitis L.B.Sm.
 Guzmania monostachia (L.) Rusby ex Mez
 Guzmania morreniana (Linden ex E.Morren) Mez
 Guzmania mosquerae (Wittm.) Mez
 Guzmania mucronata (Griseb.) Mez
 Guzmania multiflora (André) André ex Mez
 Guzmania musaica (Linden & André) Mez
 Guzmania nangaritzae H.Luther & K.F.Norton
 Guzmania nicaraguensis Mez & C.F.Baker
 Guzmania nidularioides L.B.Sm. & Read
 Guzmania nubicola L.B.Sm.
 Guzmania nubigena L.B.Sm.
 Guzmania obtusiloba L.B.Sm.
 Guzmania oligantha Lozano
 Guzmania osyana (E.Morren) Mez
 Guzmania pallida L.B.Sm.
 Guzmania palustris (Wittm.) Mez
 Guzmania paniculata Mez
 Guzmania pattersoniae Manzan.
 Guzmania patula Mez & Wercklé
 Guzmania pearcei (Baker) L.B.Sm.
 Guzmania pennellii L.B.Sm.
 Guzmania plicatifolia L.B.Sm.
 Guzmania plumieri (Griseb.) Mez
 Guzmania polycephala Mez & Wercklé
 Guzmania poortmanii (André) André ex Mez
 Guzmania pseudodissitiflora H.Luther & K.F.Norton
 Guzmania pseudospectabilis H.Luther
 Guzmania pungens L.B.Sm.
 Guzmania puyoensis Rauh
 Guzmania radiata L.B.Sm.
 Guzmania rauhiana H.Luther
 Guzmania regalis H.Luther
 Guzmania remediosensis E.Gross
 Guzmania remyi L.B.Sm.
 Guzmania retusa L.B.Sm.
 Guzmania rhonhofiana Harms
 Guzmania roezlii (E.Morren) Mez
 Guzmania rosea L.B.Sm.
 Guzmania roseiflora Rauh
 Guzmania rubrolutea Rauh
 Guzmania rugosa L.B.Sm. & Read
 Guzmania sanguinea (André) André ex Mez
 Guzmania scandens H.Luther & W.J.Kress
 Guzmania scherzeriana Mez
 Guzmania septata L.B.Sm.
 Guzmania sibundoyorum L.B.Sm.
 Guzmania sieffiana H.Luther
 Guzmania skotakii H.Luther
 Guzmania sneidernii L.B.Sm.
 Guzmania spectabilis (Mez & Wercklé) Utley
 Guzmania sphaeroidea (André) André ex Mez
 Guzmania sprucei (André) L.B.Sm.
 Guzmania squarrosa (Mez & Sodiro) L.B.Sm. & Pittendr.
 Guzmania stenostachya L.B.Sm.
 Guzmania steyermarkii L.B.Sm.
 Guzmania straminea (K.Koch) Mez
 Guzmania striata L.B.Sm.
 Guzmania stricta L.B.Sm.
 Guzmania strobilantha (Ruiz & Pav.) Mez
 Guzmania subcorymbosa L.B.Sm.
 Guzmania tarapotina Ule
 Guzmania tenuifolia (H.Luther) Betancur & N.R.Salinas
 Guzmania terrestris L.B.Sm. & Steyerm.
 Guzmania testudinis L.B.Sm. & Read
 Guzmania teucamae H.Luther & K.F.Norton
 Guzmania teuscheri L.B.Sm.
 Guzmania triangularis L.B.Sm.
 Guzmania undulatobracteata (Rauh) Rauh
 Guzmania vanvolxemii (André) André ex Mez
 Guzmania variegata L.B.Sm.
 Guzmania ventricosa (Griseb.) Mez
 Guzmania verecunda L.B.Sm.
 Guzmania victoriae Rauh
 Guzmania vinacea H.Luther & K.F.Norton
 Guzmania virescens (Hook.) Mez
 Guzmania viridiflora E.Gross
 Guzmania vittata (Mart. ex Schult. & Schult.f.) Mez
 Guzmania weberbaueri Mez
 Guzmania wittmackii (André) André ex Mez
 Guzmania xanthobractea Gilmartin
 Guzmania xipholepis L.B.Sm.
 Guzmania zahnii (Hook.f.) Mez
 Guzmania zakii H.Luther

References

Guzmania